John Wendele Shields (25 December 1929 – 29 November 2004) was a Progressive Conservative party member of the House of Commons of Canada. He was a businessman and teacher by career.

Shields was born in Grande Prairie, Alberta. He died aged 74 of heart failure following bladder surgery.

He represented the Alberta riding of Athabasca where he was first elected in the 1980 federal election and re-elected in 1984 and again in 1988. He served in the 32nd, 33rd and 34th Canadian Parliaments.

In 1991, Shields incurred controversy for allegedly shouting "Shut up, Sambo" to Howard McCurdy, the sole black member of Parliament. Shields denied ever making the comments.

Shields left federal politics after his defeat in the 1993 federal election to David Chatters of the Reform Party; he lost over half of his vote from 1988.

Shields served with the Canadian Army in Korea. He left the military in 1958 to complete high school and went on to earn a degree in education from the University of Alberta.

Member of the House of Commons, 1980–1993
 Elected to the House of Commons in February 1980, served until October 1993
 Opposition Deputy Critic - Energy, 1980–1984
 Chairman of the Alberta Caucus, 1982–1992
 Governor General Appointments, 1984–1992
 Parliamentary Secretary to the Minister of Labour
 Parliamentary Secretary to the Minister of Energy
 Parliamentary Secretary to the Minister of International Trade
 Parliamentary Secretary to the Minister of Employment and Immigration
 Parliamentary Secretary to the Minister of Consumer and Corporate Affairs

Canadian Armed Forces, 1947–1957
 1st Battalion, Princess Patricia's Canadian Light Infantry
 Airborne Regiment
 2nd Battalion, Princess Patricia's Canadian Light Infantry
 Served in Korean War as Platoon Sgt., 1950–1951
 Discharged in 1957, having achieved rank of Warrant Officer

Decorations and honours
 Canadian Armed Forces Decoration (CD)
 Korean Volunteer Services Medal (KVSM)
 Korean Champaign Medal
 United Nations Medal for Korea
 Ambassador for Peace Medal (Korean Veterans Association)

Tributes
On 1 December 2004, Brian Jean, Member of Parliament for Shields' former riding of Fort McMurray—Athabasca rose in the House of Commons to pay the following tribute:

References

External links
 
  (obituary)
 


1929 births
2004 deaths
Canadian military personnel of the Korean War
Members of the House of Commons of Canada from Alberta
People from Grande Prairie
Progressive Conservative Party of Canada MPs
Canadian military personnel from Alberta
Princess Patricia's Canadian Light Infantry soldiers